Alela Diane & Wild Divine is the third studio album by indie folk musician Alela Diane, released April 5, 2011 on Rough Trade Records. It was her sole album to feature the backing band Wild Divine, which included her father, Tom Menig (guitar), as well as her then-husband Tom Bevitori (guitar), Jonas Haskins (bass) and Jason Merculief (drums).

Track listing

Bonus disc
Independent music stores in the UK sold the album with a bonus disc, titled Home Recording & B-Sides from the Wild Divine Sessions, with the following tracks:

 "Adelaide"
 "Eastward Still"
 "Desire (Piano Demo)"
 "Long Way Down (Acoustic Demo)"
 "Creek Don't Rise"
 "The Way It Is"

References

2011 albums
Alela Diane albums